Harmen is a Dutch variation of the masculine given name Herman. A common short form is Harm. People with the name include:

Harmen Abma (1937–2007), Dutch Frisian abstract and conceptual artist
Harmen van Bol'es (1689–1764), Dutch architect, royal master builder in Russia
Harmen Bussemaker (born 1968), Dutch and American biological physicist
Harmen Fraanje (born 1976), Dutch jazz pianist and composer
Harmen Harmense Gansevoort (c.1634–1709), New Netherland settler, brewer and landowner
Harmen Hals (1611–1669), Dutch portrait painter, son of Frans Hals
Harmen de Hoop (born 1959), Dutch protest artist
Harmen Jansen Knickerbocker (c.1648–c.1720), Dutch colonist in New Netherland
Harmen Kuperus (born 1977), Dutch footballer
Harmen Liemburg (born 1966), Dutch graphic artist
Harmen Steenwijck (c.1612–aft.1656) Dutch still life painter
Harmen van Straaten, Dutch author and illustrator

References

Dutch masculine given names